Amu Nhan is one of Vietnam's foremost experts on Cham music.

External links
Cham make pilgrimage to capital Vietnam News - August 30, 2004
Cham songwriter bares his people’s soul Vietnam News - July 31, 2007

Year of birth missing (living people)
Living people
Vietnamese Cham people
Vietnamese Hindus
Vietnamese musicians
Place of birth missing (living people)